Yuri Anvarovich Utkulbayev (born 16 December 1969) is a Russian football manager and a former player. He is the  manager of Rubin Kazan.

Since December 2015 till 2016, he worked as a manager of FC Aktobe.

References

External links
 

1969 births
Living people
Soviet footballers
Russian footballers
Association football goalkeepers
FC Torpedo Miass players
FC Rubin Kazan players
FC Neftekhimik Nizhnekamsk players
Russian football managers
FC Rubin Kazan managers
Russian Premier League managers
FC Aktobe managers
Russian expatriate football managers
Expatriate football managers in Kazakhstan